The Georges Henri premetro station is part of the Brussels Metro system. It is located in the municipality of Woluwe-Saint-Lambert in the Brussels-Capital Region of Belgium. The station opened on 30 January 1975. Named for the Avenue Georges Henrilaan, which runs perpendicular to the greater ring at the south end of the station, it is located on the Boulevard Brand Whitlocklaan section of the greater ring. It is the second of four stations on the greater ring premetro, connecting by Diamant premetro station to the north and Montgomery metro station to the south. The station is served by the 7 and 25 trams and the 27, 28 and 80 buses.

As with the majority of Brussels metro stations an artwork is displayed in the station, a work entitled t Is de wind created by Flemish ceramicist Pieter Stockmans.

External links 
 Photographs of Georges Henri station
 Map showing surrounds of station

Brussels metro stations
Woluwe-Saint-Lambert